Drew James Rucinski (born December 30, 1988) is an American professional baseball pitcher for the Oakland Athletics of Major League Baseball (MLB). He has previously played in MLB for the Los Angeles Angels of Anaheim, Minnesota Twins, and Miami Marlins, and in the KBO League for the NC Dinos.

Career

Cleveland Indians
Rucinski played college baseball at Ohio State University for the Ohio State Buckeyes from 2008 to 2011. He was signed by the Cleveland Indians as an undrafted free agent in 2011. In 2012 and 2013 he played for the Rockford RiverHawks / Aviators of the Frontier League.

Los Angeles Angels
In August 2013 he signed a minor league deal with the Los Angeles Angels of Anaheim.

Rucinski was called up to the majors for the first time on July 10, 2014. He was designated for assignment on September 1, 2015.

Minnesota Twins
In December 2016, Rucinski signed a minor league contract with the Minnesota Twins. On September 6, 2017, Rucinski was released by the Twins.

Miami Marlins
On November 30, 2017, Rucinski signed a minor league contract with the Miami Marlins. He had his contract purchased on June 3, 2018. He elected free agency after the season.

NC Dinos
On November 29, 2018, Rucinski signed a one-year, $600,000 contract with the NC Dinos of the KBO League. On January 1, 2021, Rucinski re-signed with the Dinos on a one-year, $1.6 million contract. He posted a 15–10 record with a 3.17 ERA and 177 strikeouts over 178 ⅔ innings. On December 21, 2021, Rucinski re-signed with the Dinos to a $2 million deal, which tied for the second-most lucrative contract for a foreign player at the time of his signing. He became a free agent after the 2022 season.

Oakland Athletics
On December 21, 2022, Rucinski signed a one-year contract with the Oakland Athletics that contains a club option for the 2024 season.

References

External links

Ohio State Buckeyes bio

1988 births
Living people
Sportspeople from Neenah, Wisconsin
Baseball players from Wisconsin
Major League Baseball pitchers
Los Angeles Angels players
Minnesota Twins players
Miami Marlins players
Ohio State Buckeyes baseball players
Arizona League Indians players
Mahoning Valley Scrappers players
Lake County Captains players
Rockford RiverHawks players
Inland Empire 66ers of San Bernardino players
Arkansas Travelers players
Salt Lake Bees players
Iowa Cubs players
Rochester Red Wings players
Rockford Aviators players
New Orleans Baby Cakes players
NC Dinos players
KBO League pitchers
American expatriate baseball players in South Korea